Macfin railway station served the village of Macfin and the surrounding area in County Antrim.

History

The station was opened by the Ballymena, Ballymoney, Coleraine and Portrush Junction Railway on 1 July 1856. It was taken over by the Northern Counties Committee in January 1861 and closed to passengers in 1867.

The station was relocated on 19 February 1880 to coincide with the opening of the Derry Central Railway to Magherafelt, allowing Macfin Junction to be located immediately to the south-east of the station. That line closed to passengers in 1950.

Macfin station closed to passengers on 20 September 1954.

References 

Disused railway stations in County Antrim
Railway stations opened in 1856
Railway stations closed in 1954
Railway stations in Northern Ireland opened in the 19th century